Būzghān (also Puchkan, Buzjan) is a village in Torbat-e-Jam County in Iran's Khorasan-e Razavi province. Historically Buzghan was a city and was the seat of government in the historic Persian province of Jam (Zam).

Notable residents
 Abu al-Wafa' Buzjani, one of the most important Persian astronomers and mathematicians
 Abuzar Buzjani, Persian poet

Populated places in Razavi Khorasan Province
Nishapur Quarter